Tom Lin may refer to:
Tom Lin (evangelical) (born 1973), American evangelical
Tom Lin (writer) (born 1996), American novelist
Tom Lin Shu-yu (born 1976), Taiwanese filmmaker